Mang'u High School is a Kenyan Roman Catholic National High School established in 1925, located in Kiambu County along the Nairobi-Thika Highway  from Thika, Kenya. Mang'u High School is ranked among the top schools nationwide in Kenya Certificate of Secondary Education and has many eminent alumni including one Kenyan president, several vice presidents, Central Bank of Kenya governor and a former Cardinal.

Campus
The school admits bright students from financially challenged backgrounds which led to a shortfall of available funds for development. However, the school has obtained additional funding from the government.

In June 2011, the school was hit by a storm that damaged the kitchen and dining hall, knocking out the power supply for some time.

Kenya Airways offered to pay the full amount for 40 computers to set up two computer labs: one for all students and one specifically for the Aviation Technology program.

On 16 May 2011, the French ambassador to Kenya, Etienne de Poncins and the Ministry of Education, launched a French Language Resource Centre at Mang’u High School.

The School is also leading in the effort to go green by using Biogas energy. It is then used to power a generator that is used in the school.

Facilities include:
two volleyball court
two rugby pitches
three basketball courts
one football pitch
one hockey pitch
no athletics track 
one swimming pool
one table tennis 
two handball field
Twenty dormitories (Ronald Ngala, Schneider, Kimathi, Kenyatta, Tom Mboya, FR.Edwards, Old Boys, Cardinal Otunga, Arch. Ndingi, Bro. Raymond, Michuki1 and Michuki2, Njue1, Njue2 Muhoho1 and Muhoho 2 and finally Uhuru 1, Uhuru 2, Uhuru 3 and Uhuru 4)
eight science laboratories 
one chapel (installed in 2002)
two computer lab
one multi-purpose amphitheatre
farming areas and dairy facilities 
Power Mechanics and Electricity workshops
Aviation workshop.
2 Dining Halls

Academics
In 1951, Mang'u High School became the first African school in East Africa to have a full science course in physics, chemistry and biology.

Mang'u High School is ranked among the top schools nationwide in Kenya Certificate of Secondary Education. In 1989 and 2007, Mang'u High School ranked first nationwide in the Kenya Certificate of Secondary Education and led the country in the national exam.

The school also hosts the Moi National Mathematics Contest, an exam prepared by Mang'u High School teachers that brings together students from every high school in Kenya. The contest started in 1996 with 19 schools and increased to 74 schools in 1999. The number of participating students also increased from 278 to 1,200 in the same period. The National Maths Contest has gained fame as a competitive and challenging mathematics exam that prepares students for the Kenya Certificate of Secondary Education. The school also hosts a Science Congress and Aviation Symposium annually.

Admission
The school is highly selective, with only the top performing students in the Kenya Certificate of Primary Education offered admission. Once offered admission, students must submit a letter of introduction from either the chief of their area, the pastor or father in charge of their parish/mission and a letter from their primary school headmaster. This is to ensure only disciplined students are admitted to maintain the standards of the school.

There has been controversy in the past where powerful politicians secure a place for their children though they did not perform well. In 2001, the students went on strike to protest the forced transfer of Principal Paul Agali Otula after he refused to admit the son of a government official. The school admits students from both public and private schools in a quota system to ensure that top students from every county are admitted. The school applies an affirmative action policy to ensure marginalized students from hardship semi-arid areas are given a chance.

Departments
The Heads of Departments (H.O.D) are appointed by the Teachers Service Commission. 
The ten departments are as follows: 
Science Department
Humanities Department
Geography Department
Department of Technical Subjects
Mathematics Department
Business Education Department
Languages Department
Clubs Department
Boarding
Guidance and Counselling Department

Aviation
Mang'u High School is the first school in Kenya to introduce Aviation Technology as an examination subject. In 1961, Michael Stimac started the Amateur Radio Club, Electronics Club and Air Program.

The Aviation Technology program is focused on technical skills such as propulsion, thermodynamics, meteorology. The Aviation students undertake most of their studies at Wilson Airport and Moi Air Force Base in Embakasi. The original Schweizer Aircraft glider N3909A used by the Marianist Brothers for Aviation training crashed. It is moved to the workshop as a memorial and is used for educational purposes only. The school acquired a Beechcraft Queen Air 5Y-MHS twin engined light aircraft. The Kenya Air Force assists with repairs of the aircraft and training. The school received a lot of materials, tools and teaching aids from various airlines such as Kenya Airways, Airkenya Express, CMC Aviation, Aviation Luxeken and British Airways. Kenya School of Flying used to give scholarships during the last two years of High School to the students. Some students have proceeded to join the Kenya Air Force while others have studied aeronautical engineering at American, British and Russian universities.

Athletics

Possessing an athletic program over 50 years old, Mangu offers its students the opportunity to play in several sports and possesses teams that compete in basketball, soccer, handball, rugby, tennis, volleyball, and field hockey.

Clubs and societies
Mang'u high provides a wide array of clubs to develop individual student interest and abilities. The clubs invite and visit other schools for various functions pertaining to their societies. The school administration has given the clubs full support in their endeavors. For every club, there is a patron who acts as a consultant. The school has many clubs including Law, Debate, Drama, Music, Scouts, Christian Union, Seventh Day Adventist, Engineering, Science, Aviation, French, German and Computer clubs. Students appoint their own officials and raise their own funds which are held in the Bursar office (not any more).

Recently the Journalism and Chess Clubs were revamped. The school also has a German exchange program.

School emblem
The school emblem features a dove with wide spread wing to symbolize the Holy Spirit descending on Pentecost. The emblem traces the history of the Roman Catholic order of priests known as the Holy Ghost Fathers or Spiritans. The shield demonstrates the readiness to defend one's principles. The emblem also contains the school's motto Jishinde Ushinde.

School motto
Jishinde Ushinde is a Kiswahili phrase meaning conquer yourself so that you may conquer the world around you. The motto reminds the students that the greatest competition that should be waged is against one's own self (laziness, greed and selfishness) and not against other persons.

School name
The name Mang'u is a Maasai word that was adopted into the Kikuyu language when the Agikuyu people settled in Mang'u village between Thika and Gatundu in Kenya where the school was located before 1972. The actual Kikuyu pronunciation extends the 'a' sound to be closer to maang'u.

According to Brother Ken Thompson who taught English for 15 years at Mang'u High School, mang'u is a Maasai word meaning that's not me you smell. Bro. Ken is reported to have said that when the Maasai hunted lions in the tall grass, they would shout "mang'u, mang'u" to inform their fellow hunters of the situation.

The difference in the spellings Mangu and Mang'u arises from the use of the apostrophe ng''' in the written forms of Kenyan languages to differentiate between ng as in bang, hang and sing from ng as used in mango, anger and hunger.

In most formal documents and newspapers, the headlines and headings use the full name as Mangu High School without the apostrophe. Within the text of most sports articles and websites, the single name Mang'u appears with an apostrophe. Some confusion occurs whenever the word Mangu is presented without either the apostrophe or the phrase High School''.

Gallery

Notable alumni
Servant of God Maurice Michael Otunga (1923 – 2003), Cardinal and Archbishop emeritus of Nairobi and Military Ordinary emeritus for Kenya.
His Excellency Emilio Mwai Kibaki (1931-2022), 3rd President of Kenya
Hon. Moody Awori (born 1927), 9th vice president of Kenya
John Njenga (born 1928), Roman Catholic archbishop of Mombasa Diocese
Hon. Tom Mboya (1930 – 1969), founder of the Nairobi People's Congress Party and the Minister of Economic Planning and Development
Hilary Ng'weno (born 1938), the first Editor in Chief of Daily Nation
Hon. John Michuki (1932 – 2012), four-term Member of Parliament for Kangema Constituency and Cabinet Minister. 
Khadambi Asalache (1935 – 2006), Kenyan poet and author who settled in London in 1960, later a civil servant at HM Treasury, taught Swahili at the Berlitz School, and worked for the BBC African Service.
Wilfred Kiboro (born 1944), CEO Nation Media Group
Hon. Prof. George Saitoti (1945 – 2012), 6th Vice President of Kenya
Binyavanga Wainaina (1971 – 2019), author, journalist and winner of the Caine Prize, nominated by the World Economic Forum as a "Young Global Leader" but declined the award.
Hon. Cyrus Jirongo, politician and a former Member of Parliament in Kenya
Dr. Patrick Njoroge (born 1961), 9th Governor of the Central Bank of Kenya
Hon. Dr. Evans Kidero (born 1957), pharmacist, politician and first governor of Nairobi County.

References

External links
 Mang'u High School website 
 

Educational institutions established in 1925
Education in Central Province (Kenya)
Catholic secondary schools in Kenya
Spiritan schools
1925 establishments in Kenya